Oligocarpa is a genus of ascidian tunicates in the family Styelidae.

Species within the genus Oligocarpa include:
 Oligocarpa megalorchis Hartmeyer, 1911 
 Oligocarpa skoogi Michaelsen, 1923

References

Stolidobranchia
Tunicate genera